Jiao Fengbo (Chinese:焦凤波) (born July 23, 1983 in Tianjin) is a Chinese former football player who played as a defender and currently general manager of China League One club Zhejiang Greentown.

Club career
Jiao Fengbo started his football career with Beijing Longli's youth team and would move up to the senior team in 2002. By 2003 he would join fellow third-tier side Wuhan Yaqi where he stayed for two seasons before second-tier side Zhejiang Greentown became interested in his services with teammate Cai Chuchuan in 2005. The move would turn out to be a successful one and after 2006 Chinese league season the club would go on to win promotion after coming runners up in the division. After several seasons Jiao had established himself as a vital member within the team until the club had a disappointing 2009 league season, which saw them flirt with relegation. During the off season the club brought in several established defenders and Jiao was allowed to leave, this saw the transfer of him joining recently promoted side Nanchang Bayi F.C. who needed top tier experienced players. Jiao announced his retirement from professional football in 2011 and joined club chairman Song Weiping's real estate company Greentown China. He returned to Hangzhou Greentown FC (currently Zhejiang Greentown) on July 20, 2017 and was appointed as general manager of the club.

References

External links
Player profile at Nanchang Bayi F.C. website
Player profile at sodasoccer.com
Player stats at sohu.com

1983 births
Living people
Chinese footballers
Footballers from Tianjin
Zhejiang Professional F.C. players
Shanghai Shenxin F.C. players
Chinese Super League players
China League One players
Association football defenders